Ruppia tuberosa is a submerged herb in the genus Ruppia found in shallow hypersaline waters in Australia.

Distribution and habitat
This is a common submerged herb in Australian coasts, including NSW, SA, Vic, and WA (type locality).

Description
This aquatic herb is one of the early diverged species in the genus.

Ecology
The habitat is up to four times saltier than seawater.

References

tuberosa